Ben Snow is a special effects artist who has been nominated four times at the Academy Awards. He works at Industrial Light & Magic.

Early life
Snow grew up in Australia, where he attended Narrabundah College and the University of Canberra. His university degree, which he completed in 1986, was a Bachelor of Arts in Computer Studies.

Oscar history
All 4 films were in the category of Best Visual Effects

74th Academy Awards-Nominated for Pearl Harbor. Nomination shared with Eric Brevig, John Frazier and Ed Hirsh. Lost to The Lord of the Rings: The Fellowship of the Ring.
75th Academy Awards-Nominated for Star Wars: Episode II – Attack of the Clones. Nomination shared with Rob Coleman, Pablo Helman and John Knoll. Lost to The Lord of the Rings: The Two Towers.
81st Academy Awards-Nominated for Iron Man. Nomination shared with Shane Mahan, John Nelson and Dan Sudick. Lost to The Curious Case of Benjamin Button.
83rd Academy Awards-Nominated for Iron Man 2. Nomination shared with Janek Sirrs, Dan Sudick and Ged Wright. Lost to Inception.

Filmography

Avengers: Age of Ultron (2015) 
Noah (2014)
Pirates of the Caribbean: On Stranger Tides (2011)
Iron Man 2 (2010)
Terminator Salvation (2009)
Iron Man (2008)
The Spiderwick Chronicles (2007)
King Kong (2005)
Van Helsing (2004)
Star Wars: Episode II – Attack of the Clones (2002)
Pearl Harbor (2001)
Galaxy Quest (1999)
The Mummy (1999)
Deep Impact (1998)
The Lost World: Jurassic Park (1997)
Mars Attacks! (1996)
Twister (1996)
Casper (1995)
Star Trek Generations (1994)

References

External links

Living people
Special effects people
Year of birth missing (living people)
People educated at Narrabundah College
University of Canberra alumni
Artists from the Australian Capital Territory